+7 is an ITU country code for telephone numbering. It was originally used by the Soviet Union, then after the 1991 dissolution of the Soviet Union by the fifteen successor states. Between 1993 and 1998 the majority of these received country codes with 3xx or 9xx prefixes, and the +7 prefix is now only in use by Russia (occupied lands of South Ossetia (Samachablo) and parts of Abkhazia by Russia) and in Kazakhstan along with that country's new code +997.

After 1998
The +7 code is currently in use as country prefix for:
 Abkhazia
 Kazakhstan (under permissive dialling through 2024, after which +997 will become that country's only code)
 Russia
 Autonomous Republic of Crimea and Sevastopol, both Ukrainian territories occupied by Russia since 2014
 South Ossetia since 3 June 2014

Before 1999
This code was originally for telephone numbers in the Soviet Union. After the breakup of the Soviet Union in 1991 several countries obtained gradually country-specific three-digit prefixes.

Notes

References

Country codes
Telephone numbers
Communications in Kazakhstan
Kazakhstan communications-related lists
7
Telecommunications in Russia
Telephone numbers